The 2020–21 NBL season was the 32nd season for the Sydney Kings in the NBL.

Roster

Squad

Pre-season

Ladder

Game log 

|-style="background:#cfc;"
| 1
| 20 December
| The Hawks
| W 98–89
| Shaun Bruce (14)
| Craig Moller (8)
| Casper Ware (4) 
| Qudos Bank Arenaclosed event
| 1–0

Regular season

Ladder

Game log 

|-style="background:#fcc;"
| 1
| 16 January
| @ Cairns
| L 87–86
| Casper Ware (18)
| Jarell Martin (8)
| Shaun Bruce (4)
| Cairns Pop-Up Arena1,919
| 0–1
|-style="background:#cfc;"
| 2
| 23 January
| @ Cairns
| W 91–99
| Martin, Ware (22)
| Jarell Martin (10)
| Bruce, Moller (4)
| Cairns Pop-Up Arena1,930
| 1–1
|-style="background:#fcc;"
| 3
| 26 January
| @ Brisbane
| L 90–87
| Jarell Martin (26)
| Jarell Martin (11)
| Bruce, Louzada, Moller, Ware (3)
| Nissan Arena3,406
| 1–2
|-style="background:#fcc;"
| 4
| 30 January
| @ Adelaide
| L 85–80
| Dejan Vasiljevic (28)
| Craig Moller (9)
| Casper Ware (6)
| Adelaide Entertainment Centre7,087
| 1–3

|-style="background:#cfc;"
| 5
| 6 February
| @ Adelaide
| W 75–94
| Casper Ware (27)
| Jordan Hunter (11)
| Shaun Bruce (7)
| Adelaide Entertainment Centre7,317
| 2–3
|-style="background:#cfc;"
| 6
| 12 February
| New Zealand
| W 84–74
| Casper Ware (22)
| Martin, Newley (6)
| Shaun Bruce (4)
| Qudos Bank Arena5,833
| 3–3
|-style="background:#fcc;"
| 7
| 14 February
| Illawarra
| L 82–85
| Casper Ware (21)
| Craig Moller (8)
| Shaun Bruce (9)
| Qudos Bank Arena6,534
| 3–4

|-style="background:#cfc;"
| 8
| 21 February
| Adelaide
| W 94–77
| Casper Ware (23)
| Jordan Hunter (9)
| Brad Newley (4)
| John Cain Arena2,566
| 4–4
|-style="background:#fcc;"
| 9
| 23 February
| Perth
| L 106–113
| Casper Ware (34)
| Casper Ware (5)
| Casper Ware (4)
| John Cain Arena1,079
| 4–5
|-style="background:#cfc;"
| 10
| 25 February
| New Zealand
| 96–78
| Jordan Hunter (24)
| Dejan Vasiljevic (10)
| Casper Ware (5)
| John Cain Arena1,991
| 5–5
|-style="background:#fcc;"
| 11
| 27 February
| @ Melbourne
| L 83–80
| Dejan Vasiljevic (22)
| Brad Newley (8)
| Casper Ware (5)
| John Cain Arena4,206
| 5–6
|-style="background:#fcc;"
| 12
| 4 March
| @ Cairns
| L 96–92
| Dejan Vasiljevic (32)
| Jordan Hunter (6)
| Moller, Ware (4)
| State Basketball Centre1,355
| 5–7
|-style="background:#cfc;"
| 13
| 6 March
| @ South East Melbourne
| W 85–91
| Dejan Vasiljevic (19)
| Casper Ware (10)
| Casper Ware (6)
| John Cain Arena3,708
| 6–7
|-style="background:#fcc;"
| 14
| 11 March
| Illawarra
| L 69–89
| Dejan Vasiljevic (12)
| Craig Moller (6)
| Bruce, Moller (4)
| John Cain Arena997
| 6–8
|-style="background:#cfc;"
| 15
| 13 March
| @ Brisbane
| W 108–119
| Casper Ware (25)
| Jordan Hunter (8)
| Casper Ware (10)
| John Cain Arena4,183
| 7–8

|-style="background:#cfc;"
| 16
| 19 March
| Melbourne
| W 103–75
| Jordan Hunter (18)
| Martin, Moller (6)
| Moller, Ware (6)
| Qudos Bank Arena5,089
| 8–8
|-style="background:#cfc;"
| 17
| 21 March
| Cairns
| W 75–73
| Martin, Ware (16)
| Craig Moller (8)
| Louzada, Martin, Moller, Vasiljevic, Ware (2)
| Qudos Bank Arena5,187
| 9–8
|-style="background:#fcc;"
| 18
| 28 March
| Perth
| L 65–89
| Jarell Martin (18)
| Craig Moller (7)
| Casper Ware (6)
| Qudos Bank Arena5,067
| 9–9

|-style="background:#fcc;"
| 19
| 1 April
| @ Perth
| L 95–89
| Jarell Martin (27)
| Jarell Martin (11)
| Didi Louzada (4)
| RAC Arena10,123
| 9–10
|-style="background:#cfc;"
| 20
| 3 April
| Brisbane
| W 90–71
| Craig Moller (20)
| Jarell Martin (10)
| Casper Ware (9)
| Qudos Bank Arena5,439
| 10–10
|-style="background:#fcc;"
| 21
| 8 April
| Perth
| L 69–73
| Casper Ware (20)
| Jordan Hunter (13)
| Bruce, Ware (3)
| Qudos Bank Arena4,115
| 10–11
|-style="background:#fcc;"
| 22
| 11 April
| South East Melbourne
| L 84–98
| Jarell Martin (23)
| Jordan Hunter (9)
| Didi Louzada (7)
| Qudos Bank Arena4,236
| 10–12
|-style="background:#cfc;"
| 23
| 15 April
| South East Melbourne
| W 97–90
| Didi Louzada (28)
| Didi Louzada (8)
| Casper Ware (6)
| Qudos Bank Arena4,476
| 11–12
|-style="background:#cfc;"
| 24
| 17 April
| Cairns
| W 89–84
| Casper Ware (40)
| Jordan Hunter (8)
| Shaun Bruce (4)
| Qudos Bank Arena5,214
| 12–12
|-style="background:#cfc;"
| 25
| 22 April
| @ South East Melbourne
| W 81–101
| Hunter, Ware (19)
| Jordan Hunter (10)
| Casper Ware (5)
| John Cain Arena1,268
| 13–12
|-style="background:#cfc;"
| 26
| 24 April
| @ Illawarra
| W 75–79 (OT)
| Casper Ware (18)
| Shaun Bruce (13)
| Casper Ware (4)
| WIN Entertainment Centre3,724
| 14–12

|-style="background:#fcc;"
| 27
| 2 May
| @ Melbourne
| L 103–78
| Casper Ware (25)
| Craig Moller (11)
| Shaun Bruce (5)
| John Cain Arena2,214
| 14–13
|-style="background:#fcc;"
| 28
| 9 May
| Adelaide
| L 88–97 (OT)
| Jarell Martin (25)
| Jordan Hunter (9)
| Casper Ware (8)
| Qudos Bank Arena4,063
| 14–14
|-style="background:#fcc;"
| 29
| 13 May
| @ Brisbane
| L 93–70
| Jordan Hunter (15)
| Hunter, Moller (11)
| Casper Ware (3)
| Nissan Arena1,374
| 14–15
|-style="background:#cfc;"
| 30
| 16 May
| Adelaide
| W 85–75
| Jarell Martin (20)
| Craig Moller (11)
| Casper Ware (12)
| Qudos Bank Arena5,078
| 15–15
|-style="background:#fcc;"
| 31
| 20 May
| @ New Zealand
| L 89–81
| Casper Ware (20)
| Jarell Martin (6)
| Bruce, Ware (3)
| The Trusts Arena3,800
| 15–16
|-style="background:#cfc;"
| 32
| 22 May
| @ New Zealand
| W 76–81
| Jarell Martin (29)
| Jarell Martin (9)
| Shaun Bruce (5)
| TSB Stadium2,066
| 16–16
|-style="background:#fcc;"
| 33
| 27 May
| @ Perth
| L 81–67
| Jarell Martin (20)
| Jordan Hunter (9)
| Xavier Cooks (3)
| RAC Arena10,650
| 16–17
|-style="background:#cfc;"
| 34
| 29 May
| Melbourne
| W 100–98 (2OT)
| Shaun Bruce (21)
| Craig Moller (12)
| Shaun Bruce (7)
| Qudos Bank Arena6,238
| 17–17

|-style="background:#cfc;"
| 35
| 3 June
| @ Illawarra
| W 73–79
| Jarell Martin (23)
| Cooks, Martin (10)
| Casper Ware (8)
| WIN Entertainment Centre3,217
| 18–17
|-style="background:#cfc;"
| 36
| 5 June
| Brisbane
| W 83–82
| Jarell Martin (28)
| Xavier Cooks (7)
| Xavier Cooks (5)
| Qudos Bank Arena9,267
| 19–17

Transactions

Re-signed

Additions

Subtractions

Awards

Player of the Week 
Round 15, Jordan Hunter

See also 

 2020–21 NBL season
 Sydney Kings

References

External links 

 Official Website

Sydney Kings
Sydney Kings seasons
Sydney Kings season